Mycena crocea, commonly known as the walnut mycena, is a species of mushroom in the family Mycenaceae. The gills are adnate, subdistant, and yellowish, becoming lighter in age; and the spore print is white. This mushroom is saprobic and found exclusively on hickory nuts and walnuts in eastern North America. The specific epithet crocea refers to the orange color. The mushroom is commonly known as the "walnut mycena" and was previously and commonly misidentified as Mycena luteopallens.

Description
When young the cap tends to be conical or bell-shaped becoming plane or flat at maturity. The margin is striated. The surface is moist, glabrous, and somewhat hygrophanous. The flesh is thin, pallid, and yellowish. Odor and taste are not distinctive. The gills have an adnate attachment and are a pale yellowish color. They are subdistantly spaced. The stipe is central, equal (i.e., roughly equal in thickness at the top and bottom), and dark orange to yellowish.

The species is regarded as nonpoisonous, but is not necessarily edible.

Microscopic characteristics
The spores are 7–9 x 4–5 µm, smooth, and elliptical, and weakly amyloid to inamyloid. Pleurocystidia and cheilocystidia are present

Similar species
Mycena strobilinoides is similar to M. crocea, but is found in needle beds under conifers.  Atheniella adonis has a fragile stem and a more reddish-pink coloration.

Habitat and distribution
Mycena crocea are found exclusively on hickory nuts and walnuts in eastern North America. It was first described as Marasmius nucicola in 1925 but that name could not be used in Mycena.

References

crocea
Fungi described in 1991
Fungi of North America
Taxa named by Rudolf Arnold Maas Geesteranus